Immersive Education was an educational software company based in Oxfordshire, England. It was founded in 1999 by Intel as part of a collaboration with Oxford University.

Its products, such as Kar2ouche and Krucible, aim to encourage creative learning and have garnered the company awards from BETT, the British Computer Society, and the British Educational Suppliers Association.
As of July 11, 2013, Immersive Education Ltd went out of business.

References

Education companies of the United Kingdom
Software companies of the United Kingdom
1999 establishments in the United Kingdom
Software companies established in 1999
Companies based in Oxfordshire